The 2022–23 FA Women's National League is the 31st season of the competition, and the fifth since a restructure and rebranding of the top four tiers of English football by The Football Association. Starting in 1991, it was previously known as the FA Women's Premier League. It sits at the third and fourth levels of the women's football pyramid, below the Women's Championship and above the eight regional football leagues.

The league features six regional divisions: the Northern and Southern Premier divisions at level three of the pyramid, and Division One North, Division One Midlands, Division One South East, and Division One South West at the fourth level. The league consists of 72 teams, divided into six divisions of 12 each. At the end of the season the winners of the Northern and Southern Premier divisions will qualify for a play-off match to decide the overall National League champion which will be promoted to the Women's Championship. The bottom two teams from each will be relegated to the appropriate fourth tier FA WNL Division One. The winner of each Division One will be promoted to the Northern or Southern Premier Division, with the bottom two teams in those leagues relegated to respective regional leagues.

Premier Division

Northern Division 
Changes from last season:
 Despite winning the Northern Division, Wolverhampton Wanderers lost the Championship play-off and therefore remained in the Premier Division.
 Boldmere St. Michaels were promoted from Division One Midlands as champions.
 Liverpool Feds were promoted from Division One North as champions.
 Middlesbrough were relegated to Division One North.
 Hull City were relegated to Division One North.
 Sheffield F.C. were relegated to Division One Midlands.

League table

Results

Southern Division 
Changes from last season:
 Southampton F.C. were promoted to Championship as National League champions.
 Watford were relegated from Championship.
 Billericay Town were promoted from Division One South East as champions.
 Cheltenham Town were promoted from Division One South West as champions.
 Cardiff City were relegated to Division One South West.
 Chichester & Selsey were relegated to Division One South West.
 Hounslow were relegated to Division One South East.
 Keynsham Town were relegated to Division One South West.

League table

Results

Championship play-off
The overall FA Women's National League champion will be decided by a play-off match held at the end of the season between the Northern Division and Southern Division winners. The play-off match winner will also earn promotion to the Women's Championship subject to meeting licensing requirements.

Division One

Division One North 
Changes from last season:
 Liverpool Feds were promoted to Northern Premier Division as Division One North champions.
 Hull City were relegated from Northern Premier Division.
 Middlesbrough were relegated from Northern Premier Division.
 Merseyrail were promoted as North West Women's Regional Football League champions.
 York City were promoted as North East Regional Women's Football League champions.
 Alnwick Town were relegated to North East Regional Women's Football League.
 Chester-le-Street were relegated to North East Regional Women's Football League.
 F.C. United of Manchester were relegated to North West Women's Regional Football League.

League table

Division One Midlands 
Changes from last season:
 Boldmere St. Michaels were promoted to Northern Premier Division as Division One Midlands champions.
 Sheffield F.C. were relegated from Northern Premier Division.
 Northampton Town were promoted from East Midlands Regional Women's Football League as champions.
 Stourbridge were promoted from West Midlands Regional Women's Football League as champions.
 Bedworth United were relegated to West Midlands Regional Women's Football League.
 Burton Albion were relegated to West Midlands Regional Women's Football League.
 Despite finishing 10th, Wem Town were handed a reprieve from relegation.

League table

Division One South East 
Changes from last season:
 Billericay Town were promoted to Southern Premier Division as Division One South East champions.
 Hounslow were relegated from Southern Premier Division.
 Chesham United realigned from Division One South West.
 Ashford Town were promoted from London and South East Women's Regional Football League as champions.
 Wymondham Town were promoted from Eastern Region Women's Football League as champions.
 Enfield Town were relegated to London and South East Women's Regional Football League.
 Harlow Town were relegated to Eastern Region Women's Football League.
 Kent Football United were relegated to London and South East Women's Regional Football League and rebranded to Ebbsfleet United.
 Stevenage were relegated to Eastern Region Women's Football League.
 Wymondham Town withdrew from the league on 14 October 2022 and their results were expunged.
 Hounslow withdrew from the league on 28 February 2023 and their results were expunged. As a result of two teams withdrawing, there was no longer any relegation from Division One South East.

League table

Division One South West 
Changes from last season:
 Cheltenham Town were promoted to Southern Premier Division as Division One South West champions.
 Cardiff City were relegated from Southern Premier Division.
 Keynsham Town were relegated from Southern Premier Division.
 Chichester & Selsey were relegated from Southern Premier Division and rebranded to Selsey.
 Chesham United realigned to Division One South East.
 AFC St Austell were promoted from South West Regional Women's Football League as champions.
 Moneyfields were promoted from Southern Region Women's Football League as champions.
 Poole Town were relegated to South West Regional Women's Football League.

League table

See also
2022–23 FA Women's National League Cup
2022–23 FA Women's National League Plate
2022–23 Women's Super League (tier 1)
2022–23 Women's Championship (tier 2)

References

External links 
 Official website of the FA Women's National League

FA Women's National League seasons
2022–23 in English women's football
FA Women's National League